Nahir Besara (born 25 February 1991) is a Swedish professional footballer who plays as a central midfielder for Hammarby IF in Allsvenskan.

Career

Assyriska FF
Besara started his career with local club Assyriska FF, where he made his senior debut in 2008, aged 17. He went on to play another four seasons with the side in Superettan, the Swedish second tier, as a regular. During this period, he also won several caps for the Swedish national U17's and 19's.

Hammarby IF
On 27 January 2013, Besara transferred to fellow Superettan club Hammarby IF, signing a three-year deal with the club. He had a difficult first season at his new side, since head coach Gregg Berhalter regularly opted to play him out of position as a forward. Besara ended the season making 28 league appearances, scoring four goals, when his side finished 5th in the Superettan table.
 
In 2014, Besara flourished under the new head coach Nanne Bergstrand, making 26 league appearances and scoring seven goals. He made his mark towards the end of the season and scored a hattrick in a 4–2 win against Östersunds FK on home turf on 28 October, which consolidated Hammarby's top position in the league. A few weeks later, the club won a promotion to Allsvenskan through claiming the Superettan title.

In 2015, Besara continued as a starter for Hammarby in Allsvenskan. On 13 April, in a derby against Djurgårdens IF, he scored the decisive goal in a 2–1 win through a spectacular back heel. Pundit Jens Fjellström compared the move with those of the Swedish international Zlatan Ibrahimović. He left the club in July the same year, halfway through the Allsvenskan season, being the club's leading scorer with five goals in 15 games.

Göztepe
On 15 July 2015, Besara transferred to Göztepe, recently promoted to the Turkish second tier TFF First League. He made 15 competitive appearances throughout the campaign, scoring once, before terminating his contract by mutual consent in the summer of 2016.

Örebro SK
On 11 August 2016, Besara signed a two and a half-year deal with Örebro SK in Allsvenskan. The following month, he faced his former side Hammarby and scored the equalising goal in stoppage time, settling the score at 1–1. Besara chose not to celebrate the goal out of compassion for the supporters' of his old club. During the second half of the campaign, Besara played 13 games, scoring four goals, and helped Örebro to finish in 9th place in the Allsvenskan table.

In 2017, Besara established himself as one of the most affluent offensive players in Allsvenskan, as Örebro finished in 11th place. In 30 games, he scored 10 goals and provided seven assists, thus gathering the third most points of all players in the league. In July, he was nominated as player of the month in Allsvenskan, an award that eventually went to Simon Lundevall from IF Elfsborg.

In 2018, Besara had a flying start to the season and was nominated as Allsvenskan player of the month in April, but missed out the award to Jiloan Hamad from Hammarby. He ended the season scoring five goals and providing eight assists in 30 games, as Örebro finished in 9th place in the table. On 13 November the same year, it was announced that Besara would leave the club at the expiration of his contract.

Al-Fayha
On 25 January 2019, Besara signed a six-month deal with Al-Fayha in the Saudi Professional League, with an option to extend the contact for another season. Besara scored three goals in 11 league appearances, helping the club to finish in 12th place in the 2018–19 table, just above the relegation zone.

Pafos
On 20 August 2019, Besara joined Pafos FC in the Cypriot First Division.

Return to Örebro
On 3 June 2020, Besara returned to Örebro on a free transfer, signing a deal for the remainder of the year. Throughout the campaign, Besara scored 12 goals and provided four assists in 29 games, helping the club to reach a 7th place in the Allsvenskan table, their best result since 2014. In October, he was nominated to the award Allsvenskan player on the month, that eventually went to Ola Toivonen from Malmö FF.

Hatta
On 29 January 2021, Besara completed a move to Hatta in the UAE Pro League.

Third stint with Örebro
On 13 July 2021, Besara returned to Örebro in Allsvenskan for a third stint, signing a three and a half-year contract. The club was placed in the lower regions of the table at the time of his arrival, and Besara would prove unable to help the club from suffering a relegation to Superettan, despite scoring four goals in 17 games.

On 20 January 2022, it was announced that Besara would leave Örebro by mutual consent.

Return to Hammarby
On 3 February 2022, Besara signed a two-year deal with his old club Hammarby IF, returning to the Allsvenskan side after seven years. Besara featured in the final of the 2021–22 Svenska Cupen, in which Hammarby lost by 4–5 on penalties to Malmö FF after the game ended in a 0–0 draw. In Allsvenskan, Besara played all 30 fixtures, scoring 11 goals and providing 11 assists, the most in the whole league. At the end of the season, he was nominated for Allsvenskan Midfielder of the Year, an award that eventually went to Mikkel Rygaard. Although, he was voted Hammarby Player of the Year by the supporters of the club.

Career statistics

Honours
Hammarby IF
 Superettan: 2014
Individual
 Hammarby IF Player of the Year: 2022
Allsvenskan Top assist provider: 2022

References

External links

1991 births
Living people
Swedish footballers
Swedish expatriate footballers
Association football midfielders
Assyriska FF players
Hammarby Fotboll players
Örebro SK players
Göztepe S.K. footballers
TFF First League players
Al-Fayha FC players
Pafos FC players
Hatta Club players
Superettan players
Allsvenskan players
Saudi Professional League players
UAE Pro League players
Cypriot First Division players
Expatriate footballers in Turkey
Expatriate footballers in Saudi Arabia
Expatriate footballers in the United Arab Emirates
Expatriate footballers in Cyprus
Swedish expatriate sportspeople in Turkey
Swedish expatriate sportspeople in Saudi Arabia
Swedish expatriate sportspeople in the United Arab Emirates
Swedish expatriate sportspeople in Cyprus
People from Södertälje
Swedish people of Assyrian/Syriac descent
Sweden youth international footballers
Assyrian footballers
Sportspeople from Stockholm County